Millison's Wood is a large English hamlet in the parish of Meriden, situated 1.5 miles east of the village of Meriden (the closest neighbouring settlement) and 5.5 miles (8.8 km) northwest of Coventry, with which it forms part of the borough border. 

A purely residential settlement, it is located in the Metropolitan Borough of Solihull in the West Midlands, just off the westbound A45 national route. 

Meriden Business Park lies directly adjacent to Millison's Wood on the B4102, yet lies just across the border in the Metropolitan Borough of Coventry. 

The Millison's Wood Nature Reserve is located near the village.

References

Villages in the West Midlands (county)
Solihull